This is a list of churches in Lincolnshire.

The Diocese of Lincoln is responsible for churches in Lincolnshire. It is divided into the Archdeaconries of:

 Lincoln:
 Bolingbroke
 Calcewaithe and Candleshoe
 Christianity
 Graffoe
 Horncastle
 Lafford
 Louthesk
 Stow and Lindsey (separate until 1994):
 Isle of Axholme
 Corringham
 Grimsby and Cleethorpes
 Haverstoe
 Lawres
 Manlake
 West Wold
 Yarborough
 Boston:
 (Aveland and Ness with) Stamford
 Beltisloe
 Elloe East
 Elloe West
 Grantham
 Holland
 Loveden

Other Churches
Pentecostal

 Cornerstone Christian Centre, Gainsborough 
 Alive, Lincoln 
 Bridge, Lincoln 
 Ignite Elim Church, Lincoln
 New Life, Market Rasen 
 Life Church Lincoln (Birchwood)

New Frontiers
Grace Church, Lincoln
The church is now closed up

Roman Catholic Church

M
Holy Rood Church, Market Rasen

References

Lincolnshire
Churches in Lincolnshire